The Taensa language was an attempt at creating a fake Natchez language-variant, supposedly spoken by the Taensa people originally of northeastern Louisiana, and later with historical importance in Alabama. The language was created by two young co-conspirators who published purported studies of the Taensa language in 1880-1882 that were later proven fraudulent, unequivocally in 1908-1910 by John R. Swanton.

Some French missionary priests reported that they learned Natchez in order to speak to the Taensa; Mooney's summary of the people and missionary efforts describes the Taensa language as a variant of the Natchez.

The language has received academic attention in largest part for the fact that two young men, one a clerical student named Parisot, published purported "material of the Taensa language, including papers, songs, a grammar and vocabulary" in Paris in 1880-1882, reports which led to considerable interest on the part of philologists and linguists of the time. The work proved to be a "fraudulent invention... of some one... from whom the manuscripts had originally come" or perhaps of the student Parisot. The fraudulently invented language was unrelated to the actual language variant spoken by the Taensa people; the invention was unique enough in its grammar to arouse the interest referred to above. Several eminent scholars were taken in by the materials, but by 1885, Daniel Garrison Brinton and Julien Vinson had reported the work to be fraudulent. Later, Swanton exposed the work as a clear hoax, and the matter of the Parisot fraud continues to receive historical and linguistic attention to modern times.

Background of actual people and language
The native Americans originally of northeastern Louisiana known as the Taensa were related to, but had separated themselves from the peoples of the Natchez nation, following a series of conflicts with them and others—e.g., the Taensa had been subject to slave raids by the Chickasaw, Yazoo, and Natchez. By the time of the Natchez Massacre under the governor of French Louisiana, Bienville, the Taensa had moved from Louisiana to Alabama. Also referred to as the Tensas, Tensaw, and grands Taensas (in French), and by many other near variants (see the article on the Taensa people), the people so named were village-dwelling native Americans originally from lands near present day Tensas Parish, Louisiana. Relocating several times in response to inter-tribal hostilities, the Taensa ultimately migrated, ca. 1740, under French protection to lands along the current Tensas river near Mobile, Alabama, only to return to the Red River in Louisiana after land cessions by the French to the English in 1763, then moving southward to Bayou Boeuf and Grand Lake before their disappearance as a community.

While French missionary priests François de Montigny and Jean-François Buisson de Saint-Cosme stated that the Taensa spoke Natchez, a language that both missionaries were learning, others, such as Mooney describe the Taensa language as a variant of the Natchez.

The Taensa spoken by these people was a form of the Natchez, a language isolate that may be related to the Muskogean languages. Over time small differences in pronunciation emerged, but the two languages appear, based on the available data, and from this historical vantage point, to have been largely the same. Beginning in the early nineteenth century, the Taensa people became intermixed with other groups, particularly the Chitimacha. Their language survived into the second half of the nineteenth century, and people identifying as Taensa have been documented from the 1930s through to the present day.

The fraudulent invention

Document

In the 1880s two French students published a grammar and other material of what they claimed to be the hitherto undocumented language of the Taensa people of Louisiana. Jean Parisot, who submitted the documents for publication in Paris, was a nineteen-year-old student at a seminary in Plombières, France. The Grammaire et vocabulaire de la langue Taensa, avec textes traduits et commentés par J.-D. Haumonté, Parisot, L. Adam was published in 1882 in Paris and caused a stir among linguists.

The material included an outline of the grammar, vocabulary and fragments of text in the Taensa language. Parisot claimed that it was from Spanish sources written in Louisiana. When the material was published, two eminent French Americanists, Lucien Adam and Julien Vinson, supported the work.

Controversy
Albert Samuel Gatschet defended the work at first. Gatschet stated that the language was unrelated to any other.  In 1885 he started studies in Indiana, and thereafter became silent on the subject.  The eminent ethnologist Daniel Garrison Brinton was also taken in at first. 
Writing of native American literature in 1883, Brinton quoted a complete song from the grammar, praising the songs as "Ossianic in style." Later Brinton reversed his position and declared that the material was fake, publishing his reasons in 1885. Vinson also came to believe it was a hoax. Adam continued to defend the work for a while, but in 1885 he and Brinton co-authored Le Taensa a-t-il été forgé de toutes pièces, which discussed whether the entire work was a forgery. John R. Swanton published definitive works in 1908 and 1910 that removed all doubt based on primarily historical rather than linguistic grounds. The text showed "palpable and gross" evidences of fraud. Swanton presented evidence that the Taensa people spoke either the Natchez language or a close variant of it.

The fraud could have been the work of the unknown individual that created the manuscripts and gave them to Parisot, or it could have been the work of Parisot, although Adam and Parisot jointly stated that the documents had not been Parisot's work when the scandal broke in 1885. Parisot later spent time in Turkey and in 1898 and 1902 published further works on linguistics based on his experience there.

Claire Bowern has challenged Brinton and Swanton's conclusion, arguing that the available evidence does not conclusively point to a hoax.

See also
 Taensa
 Natchez language
 Natchez people
 Julien Vinson

Citations

References cited

 Limited view, no internal content provided.

 Limited view, no internal content provided.

  Via NewAdvent.org.

Further reading
 
 

Natchez
Linguistic hoaxes
19th-century hoaxes
Hoaxes in France
Spurious languages